TED Ankara Kolejliler Spor Kulübü, more commonly known as TED Ankara Kolejliler is a professional basketball team from the city of Ankara in Turkey. Their home arena is the Ankara Arena with a capacity of 10,400 seats, which was opened in April 2010. The team currently competes in the Turkish Basketball First League (TBL), the second tier league of basketball in Turkey.

History
The team played in Turkish Basketball League (now called BSL) between 1966-1977, 1979-1981, 1982-1983, 1984-1985, 1990-1995, 1996-1997, 1998-2003 and 2006-2009. The team promoted the Turkish Basketball League (now called BSL) from the TB2L in May 2012.

The team made its European club competitions debut at the Cup Winners' Cup in the 1973-74 season due to winning Turkish Basketball Cup in 1972-73. In the early nineties, it reached the Korac Cup qualifying rounds three times, from 1991-92 to 1993-94. Most recently, it reached the 2014 Eurocup quarterfinals.

Sponsorship names
TED Ankara Kolejliler has had several denominations through the years due to its sponsorship;
 Kolej: 1966-1993
 Tiffany Tomato Kolejliler: 1993-1994
 Kolejliler: 1994-1996
 TED Kolej: 1996-1998
 Maydonoz Kolejliler: 1998-2001
 TED Kolej: 2001-2006
 CASA TED Kolejliler: 2006-2009
 Optimum TED Ankara Kolejliler: 2009-2012
 TED Ankara Kolejliler  : 2012-13
 Aykon TED Ankara Kolejliler : 2013-2014
 Rönesans TED Ankara Kolejliler : 2014–2015
 Halk Enerji TED Ankara Kolejliler : 2018-present

Players

Current roster

Notable players 

 Rüştü Yüce
 Erdal Poyrazoğlu
 Barış Küce
 Aytek Gürkan
 Ömer Bozer
 Rahmi Özyar
 Murat Evliyaoğlu
 Victor Brejnoi
 Bekir Yarangüme
 Haluk Yıldırım
 Kerem Gönlüm
 Murat Evliyaoğlu
 Nedim Yücel
 Ömer Ünver
 Polat Kocaoğlu
 Serkan Erdoğan
 Tolga Tekinalp
 Tutku Açık
 Vladimir Golubović
 Kirk Penney
 Orlando Vega
 Elshad Gadashev
 Goran Jagodnik
 Jovo Stanojević
 Vanja Plisnić
 Martynas Gecevičius
 Ashraf Amaya
 Ben Woodside
 Chuck Davis
 Clay Tucker
 Donald Little
 Erek Hansen
 Ivan McFarlin
 Marques Green
 Matt Hill
 Melvin Robinson
 Michael Maddox
 Ronald Coleman
 Sylvester Gray
 Shannon Shorter

Season by season

Honours

International
 Eurocup:
 Quarter-final (1): 2013–2014

Domestic
 Turkish Basketball Cup:
 Winners (1): 1972-73

References

External links
 Official Website 
 Eurobasket.com Profile
 TBLStat.net Profile 

Basketball teams in Turkey
Sports teams in Ankara
Basketball teams established in 1954
1954 establishments in Turkey